The Big Noise is a 1936 American romantic–comedy crime film directed by Frank McDonald. It starred Guy Kibbee, Warren Hull, Alma Lloyd, Dick Foran, Marie Wilson, and Henry O'Neill.

Story
Julius Trent, being unable to adopt new technology retires, from his position as president of a textile company. He then goes into partnership with Ken Mitchell in a dry cleaning venture. His daughter Betty becomes romantically involved with his partner. A group of racketeers attempt to extort money from him so he attempts to singlehandedly run them out of town.

Cast
 Guy Kibbee as Julius Trent
 Warren Hull as Ken Mitchell
 Alma Lloyd as Betty Trent
 Dick Foran as Don Andrews
 Marie Wilson as Daisy
 Henry O'Neill as Charlie Caldwell
 Olin Howland as Harrison
 Virginia Brissac as Mrs. Trent
 William Davidson as Welford Andrews
 Andre Berenger as Mr. Rosewater
 Robert Emmett Keane as Mr. Aldrich
 Eddie Shubert as Machine Gun Nolan

References

Sources

External links
 
 BFI

1936 films
American romantic comedy films
Films directed by Frank McDonald
American black-and-white films
1936 romantic comedy films
1930s English-language films
1930s American films
Warner Bros. films